Lewis Ward is the name of:

Lewis Ward (Canadian football), Canadian football player
Lewis Ward (footballer), English footballer